The core common area is that .

Named after magnetic core memory, the term has persisted into the modern era and is commonly used by both the Fortran and BASIC languages.

See also
 Chain loading

Operating system technology